Hortense Aka-Anghui (December 18, 1933 – September 30, 2017) was an Ivorian politician.

Born Hortense Dadié in Agboville, Aka-Anghui was the sister of Bernard Dadié. She was elected to the National Assembly as a member of the Democratic Party of Côte d'Ivoire – African Democratic Rally in 1965, later serving as vice-president of the Assembly and remaining a member until 1990, with Gladys Anoma and Jeanne Gervais, she was one of the first women elected to that body. From 1980 to 2017, she served as mayor of Port-Bouët. She also served as the Minister for Women's Affairs from 1986 to 1990, and from 1984 until 1991 as president of the Association des Femmes Ivoiriennes. She also served as a member of the Central Committee and the Political Bureau of her political party. Aka-Anghui trained as a pharmacist, earning a doctorate from the University of Paris in 1961, and operated a pharmacy and medical laboratory in Treichville, in which town she had been raised, prior to entering politics.

References

1933 births
2017 deaths
Members of the National Assembly (Ivory Coast)
Government ministers of Ivory Coast
Women's ministers
Mayors of places in Ivory Coast
Women mayors of places in Ivory Coast
20th-century Ivorian women politicians
20th-century Ivorian politicians
21st-century Ivorian women politicians
21st-century Ivorian politicians
Democratic Party of Côte d'Ivoire – African Democratic Rally politicians
Ivorian pharmacists
University of Paris alumni
People from Agboville
People from Abidjan
Women government ministers of Ivory Coast
Women pharmacists
Ivorian expatriates in France